The Masnaa Border Crossing is an international border crossing between the countries of Lebanon and Syria. It is completely land-based and links the customs checkpoints of Masnaa, Lebanon, and Jdeidat Yabous, Syria. An 8 km no man's land of desolate neutral territory buffers the distance between the border stations. It is the primary crossing point between the countries, linking the capital cities of Beirut and Damascus.

Recent history
The border has been closed many times in its history and has been an ongoing subject of controversy, mostly due to its minor role in Middle Eastern hostilities. On April 29, 2010, a US security delegation visited the crossing, causing concern from the Lebanese Government and Hezbollah militants operating out of Lebanon.

References

Lebanon–Syria border crossings